The Great Detective is a Canadian television drama.

The Great Detective may also refer to:

The Great Detective (book), a non-fiction book about Sherlock Holmes by Zach Dundas
The Great Detective (film), a 2017 Chinese fantasy film
 "The Great Detective," a prequel to the Doctor Who episode "The Snowmen"